Lake Lanier (officially Lake Sidney Lanier) is a reservoir in the northern portion of the U.S. state of Georgia. It was created by the completion of Buford Dam on the Chattahoochee River in 1956, and is also fed by the waters of the Chestatee River. Named for poet Sidney Lanier, it was built and is operated by the U.S. Army Corps of Engineers for flood control and water supplies.

It is patrolled by the Georgia Department of Natural Resources (GDNR), as well as local law enforcement. The states of Georgia, Alabama and Florida all have rights to the water of the reservoir, as it feeds rivers going through those areas. The Corps of Engineers has responsibilities to regulate flow for flood control and water use. In addition, it has to ensure that water is available to fulfill such federal mandates as under the Endangered Species Act, to support downstream species. The rapid suburbanization of the Atlanta region, in particular, has greatly increased water consumption by private homeowners for lawns and gardens. During droughts of the 21st century, Lake Lanier reached record lows, and regional actions have been needed to reduce area water usage.

Geography
The lake is in Hall, Forsyth, Dawson, Gwinnett, and Lumpkin counties, split about 60%, 30%, 5%, 4%, and 1%, respectively, filling the valley into numerous small arms and fingers. The former thalweg of the Chestatee and the Chattahoochee south of it form the county line between Hall and a corner of Gwinnett to the east, and Dawson and Forsyth counties to the west. The land that now sits at the bottom of Lake Lanier was, before the 1950s, forest and farmland. Before the lake was completely filled, construction crews felled the treetops, leaving tall stumps to remain, in some areas, not far beneath the lake's surface.

One of the main purposes of the lake is flood control of the Chattahoochee River downstream, mainly protecting metro Atlanta. Since the construction of Buford Dam, there have been only three major flooding events on the downstream section. The most severe flooding event was in 2009, following a two-year drought; the most recent was in 2013.

Prior history
Prior to the groundbreaking of the reservoir in 1950, the town of Oscarville occupied a part of the current location of the lake. Oscarville was a small community and the site of a 1912 lynching, which resulted in the forced displacement of all 1,100 Black people from Forsyth County by the White residents. The Black residents comprised about 10 percent of the population at the time. The current Black population is about 4 percent of the area's population.

Reservoir
The lake's original purposes were to provide hydroelectricity, navigation, and flood control of the Chattahoochee River, and water supply for the city of Atlanta.

The $1 billion (equivalent to $ billion in ) project was authorized by Congress in 1946, and Buford Dam broke ground on March 1, 1950. A stretch of Georgia Highway 53 had to be abandoned that ran too close to the planned shoreline. Gainesville's Looper Speedway was also condemned and abandoned.

More than $2 million (equivalent to $ million in ) had been spent by the Corps on preliminary construction when the House Committee on Appropriations refused to provide more funds in June 1951. During that summer Atlanta mayor William Hartsfield traveled to Washington numerous times pressing southern Democratic Senators Richard Russell Jr. and Walter F. George to restore funding to ensure Atlanta's water supply during droughts. Hartsfield returned to Washington in 1955 to lobby for $11 million (equivalent to $ million in ) more for the dam, which had a target completion date of 1956, again stressing the importance of an adequate water supply for his growing city. Congress approved the funds, and the dam was completed and opened on schedule.

On February 1, 1956, Lake Lanier began filling when the sluice gates of Buford Dam were closed. Buford Dam was dedicated on October 9, 1957 in a ceremony officiated by a number of elected officials, including U.S. Senator Richard B. Russell, Georgia Governor Marvin Griffin, and Atlanta mayor William B. Hartsfield. Lake Lanier reached its intended full-pool level on August 1, 1958, approximately one year later than initially expected due to droughts. In early fall of 1958, the region had two solid months of drought, which would have left the Chattahoochee and its tributaries nearly dry, if not for the construction of Buford Dam and the reserve of Lake Lanier.

Since the 1990s, the Corps of Engineers, Florida, Georgia, and Alabama have all been fighting for use of the water held in Lake Lanier. Federal law mandates that when a river flows between two or more states, each state has a right to an equal share of the water. Additionally, laws such as the Endangered Species Act require that water be available to preserve and support the threatened or endangered species that live in or around Chattahoochee River and Apalachicola Bay.

According to the Army Corps of Engineers, the Dam has a current installed capacity of 126 megawatts and a hydraulic head of 136 feet. Other pertinent information on the reservoir, power plant, etc. can be found on the Mobile District Corps of Engineers web site. Also, historic operational information on lake elevations, discharges, inflows and power generation for all the Corps projects on the ACF are available.

Drought 2007–2009

In June 2006, the USACE revealed that the new lake gauge at the dam, replaced in December 2005, was not properly calibrated, yielding a lake level reading nearly two feet (over half a meter) higher than the actual level. Because of this, nearly 22 billion U.S. gallons (over 82 billion liters) of excess water had been released. This was above the already planned excess releases to support the successful spawning of gulf sturgeon in the Apalachicola River and to protect several species of oysters in Apalachicola Bay from excessive saltwater intrusion.

Georgia Governor Sonny Perdue said that the Corps had created a "manmade drought", because most of the state was already having dry conditions. This came at a time when outdoor water-use restrictions were being put in place by local governments. The high rate of suburban growth in the area resulted in a high rate of water consumption to care for the many lawns which had replaced forests. Because of the error in managing Lake Lanier, the governor's office declared a drought and enacted a ban on outdoor water use from 10 am to 4 pm, in addition to the permanent weekly odd/even address system. Other local counties imposed further restrictions or total bans, based on each water system's conditions. Outdoor watering was banned completely as the state suffered the worst drought in its recorded history.

On October 16, 2007, Governor Perdue gave the USACE until the evening of October 17 to come up with a plan for the continued release of water for Florida wildlife. Senator Johnny Isakson stood before the Georgia General Assembly saying, "The health, safety and welfare of people are threatened. They are threatened by an act this Congress passed that had no intention to threaten them." He eventually withdrew his threat to sue the Corps of Engineers, but the Lake Lanier Association indicated that it would file a private legal action. Governor Perdue's attempts to reach an agreement with Florida over water releases fell through, leaving the final decision on releases from the lake to be made by the U.S. Fish and Wildlife Service.

The day after Christmas, the water level began rising from week to week.

A similar drought situation occurred in late 2008.

After rainfall during the winter of 2008–2009, on March 30, 2009, the climatologist of the state of Georgia, David Stooksbury, declared the drought over, noting: "soil moisture is near normal, stream flows are near normal. Small and medium-sized reservoirs are full." Stooksbury continued, "There is still the 500-pound gorilla sitting in the room and that’s Lanier." It did not reach the full summer pool of  during mid-2009, remaining more than  lower. Following weeks of heavy rain in North Georgia, Lake Lanier returned to full pool in mid-October 2009. The record high is  set in April 1964.

The record-low lake levels had revealed parts of the lake bottom not seen since the 1950s, including remnants of a road and foundations of homes that had to be abandoned for the construction. More recent additions to the lake—including discarded trash, boat batteries and sunken boats—were discovered. Local efforts were organized to clean up the lake bottom. Several automobiles, some stolen, and discarded firearms were also recovered by law enforcement officials.

Lawsuits 

In July 2009, a federal judge from Minnesota (chosen from a neutral location as an arbiter) ruled that Congress never authorized Lake Lanier to be used as a source of the water supply for metro Atlanta. Georgia was given three years to stop withdrawing from the lake (except for the adjacent cities of Gainesville and Buford), unless Congress authorized it, or if it and the other two states using water from the reservoir came to agreement about use. The Atlanta Regional Commission chairman noted that if enforced, cutting drinking water to 75% of current users in the region would require disaster aid from the Federal Emergency Management Agency (FEMA).

In June 2011, the Eleventh Circuit Court of Appeals reversed the 2009 district court decision and confirmed the USACE's authority to regulate Lake Lanier for Atlanta's water supply. The Corps responded in June 2012 with plans for further analysis and evaluation of proposals from the three states.

In 2013, Florida filed an original action against Georgia in the Supreme Court of the United States, requesting equitable apportionment of waters in the ACF Basin. On November 3, 2014, the Supreme Court granted Florida leave to file the complaint. On April 1, 2021, the Supreme Court dismissed the complaint in a unanimous opinion, holding that Florida did not prove any serious injury caused by Georgia.

Recreation

The lake is popular with boaters, houseboats, jet-skiers and others, particularly around the summer holidays. Over 10 million people visit the lake annually, including its marinas and the Lake Lanier Islands waterpark. The rowing and sprint canoeing events during the 1996 Summer Olympics were held on the north end of the lake. It has since hosted many international events such as the 2003 ICF Canoe Sprint World Championships, 2016 Pan American Sprint Canoe/Kayak Championships and the 2018 ICF Dragon Boat World Championships. The venue is host to many other events such as Food Truck Friday, ACRA Championships and the Atlanta Hong Kong Dragon Boat Festival.

Lake Lanier has over 90 corps, state, county and city parks spread around its 680 miles of shoreline, 23 of which provide swim beaches. All of these parks are accessible by land and some by water and most have other amenities such as picnic areas, restrooms, boat ramps and playgrounds. There are also dozens of beaches on Lake Lanier that are on islands located all over Lake Lanier.

Lake Lanier Islands is a resort complex on the lake, opened in 1974, that includes a resort hotel called Legacy Lodge (formerly Emerald Pointe Hotel), a water park, and a golf course, among other amenities. The complex also included a second resort hotel, PineIsle, which operated from 1975 to 2005, and was demolished in 2008. Both hotels were sold by CNL Hotels & Resorts, a hotel investment firm in Florida, to Georgia businessman Virgil Williams. In 2017–2018, Margaritaville was announced to take over Lanier Islands Park. Lake Lanier Islands sits on a ground lease from the Lake Lanier Islands Development Authority, which was established by the Georgia General Assembly in 1962 to promote tourism development on the islands, and in turn leases the land from the U.S. Army Corps of Engineers.

Lake Lanier was the site of the 1997 Bilderberg conference.

Magical Nights of Lights is an animated drive-through display that ends with a Christmas village, carnival rides, bonfire, Santa Shop, and live nativity.

Due to the displaced cemeteries and unmarked graves Lake Lanier submerged during its creation, the body of water is rumored to be haunted with ghosts.

Effects of 21st-century droughts
At the end of 2007, the water level of Lake Lanier became notable, on a daily basis, for setting record-low levels. However, water levels continued to decline almost daily during the month of December 2007.

On December 27, the water level began rising above the record low level, but fluctuating every few days, as affected by further rain and snow during December and January 2008. It reversed more than 18 days of losses within 5 days.

Multiple rain storms further to the south, along the Chattahoochee River to Apalachicola Bay, brought increased freshwater to the Florida wildlife in November and December 2007, despite the reduced water flow from Lake Lanier at Buford Dam. Rainfall along the lower Chattahoochee River was often greater overall than above Lake Lanier, as it spanned the longer length of the river.

Metropolitan Atlanta received far above-average rainfall amounts throughout September and October 2009, and had record floods.

In 2011 and 2012, the water fell to some of the lowest points on record set during the 2007 droughts. In the spring and summer of 2013, the water level reached some of the highest points due to high amounts of rain and flooding in the north Georgia area. By late June 2016, the southern parts of Forsyth County were having severe drought, and water use was ordered to be reduced.

References

External links

"Growth, growth everywhere but not a drop to drink" News article about the 2007–2008 drought
Lake Lanier Protection Group
Lake Lanier Information
Lake Lanier Water Levels

Venues of the 1996 Summer Olympics
LLanier
Bodies of water of Dawson County, Georgia
Bodies of water of Forsyth County, Georgia
Bodies of water of Gwinnett County, Georgia
Bodies of water of Hall County, Georgia
Olympic canoeing venues
Olympic rowing venues
Protected areas of Dawson County, Georgia
Protected areas of Forsyth County, Georgia
Protected areas of Gwinnett County, Georgia
Protected areas of Hall County, Georgia
Lanier
Rowing venues in the United States